Justin van Staden is a South African rugby union player who last played for the  in the Currie Cup and in the Rugby Challenge.

Career
In 2012, he joined Despatch Rugby Club, but was soon drafted into the  squad, where he was included in their 2012 Vodacom Cup squad.

He was also named in a South African Universities team that played against  in 2013.

He was a member of the Pumas side that won the Vodacom Cup for the first time in 2015, beating  24–7 in the final. Van Staden made eight appearances during the season, contributing 30 points with the boot.

References

South African rugby union players
Eastern Province Elephants players
Blue Bulls players
Living people
1990 births
Tshwane University of Technology alumni
Rugby union fullbacks
Rugby union players from Limpopo